Count Rudolf von Walderdorff (died 1866) was an Austrian malacologist and entomologist. He was a member of the Walderdorff family, a noble German family. He  was a captain in the Austrian Imperial Army. He was killed in the Battle of Königgrätz.

Works
Rudolf Graf Walderdorff (1864) System. Verzeichniss der im Kreise Cattaro (Süd-Dalmatien) mit Ausnahme der Biela-Gora und in einigen angrenzenden Theilen von Montenegro und türkisch Albanien vorkommenden Land- und Süsswasser-Mollusken. Verhandlungen der Zoologisch-Botanischen Gesellschaft in Wien. 14: 503- ]514.
[Eupithecia actaeata] Correspondenz-blatt des Zoologisch-mineralogischen Vereins in Regensburg 23: 82

References
 Zobodat

Austrian malacologists
Austrian lepidopterists
1866 deaths
Year of birth missing
Counts of Germany
Walderdorff family